Whaley is a village in Derbyshire, England.

Whaley may also refer to:

Whaley (surname)
Whaley Bridge, town in Derbyshire, England
Whaley Thorns, village in Derbyshire, England
Whaley Lake, reservoir in Dutchess County, New York, United States
Whaley House (disambiguation), several buildings
A Royal Navy Jackspeak term for Whale Island, Hampshire